MundoMax was an American Spanish language broadcast television television network owned by Colombian broadcaster RCN Televisión, which was launched on August 13, 2012 under the name MundoFox. , the network currently has affiliation agreements with 42 television stations. MundoMax maintains a national cable network feed that is distributed directly to cable, satellite and IPTV providers in certain media markets not listed in this article, as an alternative method of distribution in areas without either the availability or the demand for a locally based owned-and-operated or affiliate station.

This article is a listing of current and future MundoMax affiliates in the continental United States, U.S. possessions and areas of Mexico located near U.S. cities along the U.S. border (including subchannel affiliates, satellite stations and select low-power translators), arranged alphabetically by state, and based on the station's city of license and followed in parentheses by the Designated Market Area if it differs from the city of license. There are links to and articles on each of the broadcast stations, describing their histories, technical information (such as broadcast frequencies) and any local programming. The station's virtual (PSIP) channel number follows the call letters.

The article also includes a list of its former affiliate stations, which is also based on the station's city of license or market, and denotes the years in which the station served as an affiliate of the network under either the MundoFox and/or MundoMax identities as well as the current status of the corresponding channel that carried the network.

Final affiliates
Note: This list contains affiliates that have not as of yet had their final affiliation or station fates confirmed by reliable sources after MundoMax's closure, they have not been merged with the former affiliates table, or have not been updated within this article as of yet.

Former affiliates

References

External links
 

MundoFox
MundoMax